Vasudev Kalkunte Aatre (born 1939) is an Indian scientist and former head of the Defence Research and Development Organisation (DRDO), India's premier Defence research and development organization. In that capacity, he also served as the Scientific Advisor to the Defence Minister (Raksha Mantri). He is a recipient of the Padma Vibhushan award.

Biography
Aatre was born in 1939 in Bangalore. He completed his BE in electrical engineering from University Visvesvaraya College of Engineering (UVCE), Bangalore, then part of University of Mysore in 1961 and a master's degree from the Indian Institute of Science (IISc), Bangalore, in 1963. He was awarded a PhD in electrical engineering from the University of Waterloo, Canada, in 1967. Thereafter, he worked as a professor of electrical engineering at the Technical University of Nova Scotia, Halifax, Canada, until 1980. He was a visiting professor at IISc till 1977. He is a former member of the Defence Research & Development Service (DRDS).

In 1980, Aatre joined DRDO at the Naval Physical & Oceanographic Laboratory (NPOL), Cochin, and became its Director in 1984. He was later appointed as chief controller (R&D) of DRDO. In February 2000, he replaced Abdul Kalam as the director general of DRDO and SA to RM, serving as scientific advisor to the then Defence Minister, George Fernandes. He retired in October 2004 and was replaced by Dr. M. Natrajan.

Aatre was awarded the Padma Bhushan award in 2000 by the then President K. R. Narayanan.
He was bestowed with Padma Vibhushan award, India's second highest civilian award in 2016. He is now chairman of Nit goa and IIEST SHIBPUR, Howrah.

In 2015, Karnataka Science and Technology awarded him with the academy’s Lifetime Achievement Award for 2014.

See also
 List of University of Waterloo people

References

Further reading
 Dr. K Divyananda; Dr. W Selvamurthy (2005). Soaring High: A Biography of Dr. V. K. Aatre. New Delhi: IK International 

Indian electrical engineers
Recipients of the Padma Bhushan in science & engineering
1939 births
Living people
Scientists from Bangalore
Indian Institute of Science alumni
University of Mysore alumni
University of Waterloo alumni
Fellows of The National Academy of Sciences, India
Recipients of the Padma Vibhushan in science & engineering
Engineers from Karnataka
20th-century Indian engineers
University Visvesvaraya College of Engineering alumni